Takahchi or Takah Chi may refer to:
 Takahchi, Germi
 Takah Chi, Parsabad